Dominic Johnson may refer to:

Dominic Johnson, Baron Johnson of Lainston (born 1974), British financier, hedge fund manager and politician
Dominic Johnson (pole vaulter) (born 1975), Saint Lucian pole vaulter and decathlete
Dominic D. P. Johnson, British academic